Atelea Vea is a Tonga international rugby league footballer who last played for the Leigh Centurions in the Super League. He has previously played for the Melbourne Storm, Cronulla Sharks, St. George Illawarra and the London Broncos. 

He made his first-grade début for the Sharks in 2009. He was selected to play for Tonga in the 2009 Pacific Cup.

Background
Vea was born in Sydney, Australia.

Playing career

2009–10: Career with Cronulla
Vea made his first-grade début for the Cronulla Sharks away to the Penrith Panthers, in a round 10 loss, a game in which he came on off the interchange bench. He then featured in the 26–4 loss at home to the St. George Illawarra Dragons in the next round, where he was again on the bench. His first start for the Sharks came when the side hit something of a run of form. He started out in the second-row in a narrow 13–10 win over the Parramatta Eels, and he kept his starting place in wins over New Zealand Warriors (18–10), Canberra Raiders (24–22) and the thumping 46–16 thrashing of Brisbane Broncos, all of which were consecutive appearances. He was, in round 16 at the Sydney Roosters, shuffled to lock, where the Sharks lost their first game in four. He then had to wait another 10 rounds before being selected again, in the 26–24 loss to the South Sydney Rabbitohs.

2011: Career with Melbourne
In 2011, he played for the Melbourne Storm team, playing 9 games for the team, with all appearances of the bench. His performance in a losing effort in Round 26 against the Sydney Roosters was praised by coach Craig Bellamy given the injury toll on the night.

2012–13: Career with St George-Illawarra
He played for the St George Illawarra Dragons in 2012 and 2013.

2014: Career with London
He joined the London Broncos on 24 February 2014.

Representative career
He made his international début for Tonga in a 44–14 defeat by Papua New Guinea, where Vea scored a try. As Tonga did not progress to the final, Vea's next game was in the third/fourth place play-off loss to Fiji.

References

External links
Leigh Centurions profile

1986 births
Living people
Australian sportspeople of Tongan descent
Australian rugby league players
Cronulla-Sutherland Sharks players
Illawarra Cutters players
Leigh Leopards players
London Broncos players
Melbourne Storm players
Rugby league players from Sydney
Rugby league second-rows
St Helens R.F.C. players
St. George Illawarra Dragons players
Tonga national rugby league team players